Orecta is a genus of moths in the family Sphingidae first described by Walter Rothschild and Karl Jordan in 1903.

Species
Orecta acuminata Clark 1923
Orecta fruhstorferi Clark 1916
Orecta lycidas (Boisduval 1875)
Orecta venedictoffae Cadiou 1995

References

Ambulycini
Moth genera
Taxa named by Walter Rothschild
Taxa named by Karl Jordan